Ocean Racing Technology (ORT) was a racing team that took part in both the GP2 Main Series and the GP2 Asia Series Championships. The team, owned by Tiago Monteiro and José Guedes, was formed at the end of the 2008 season after being purchased from BCN, a team which never enjoyed much success in GP2 (two podiums in four years). The driver and the entrepreneur created a structure based on recognized professionals and quickly started to secure first-class results, making it possible for the Portuguese Racing team to fight with the more advanced teams in the FIA accredited championship that is the main feeder series for Formula One.

While BCN was the only GP2 team that had yet to win a race (contributing factors being BCN Competición's frequent use of a rotating selection of paying drivers), the change to ORT meant a full transformation (the team kept only the frames, discarding all the rest, and hiring new staff). In their first year in GP2, Álvaro Parente won the first race for the team at the 2009 Belgian GP2 Feature Race, in a round where he also got pole position and fastest lap.

History 
The team was created in 2002 and their debut season was in Formula Nissan with Andrea Belicchi and Carlos Martin as drivers.

In 2003 and 2004, BCN raced in International Formula 3000/GP2 Series, finishing as runner-up in both the drivers and teams championships in 2004.

In 2005-06, the team was involved in the new A1 Grand Prix series managing the A1 Team South Africa car, however DAMS took over the team for 2006-07.

Formula 3000 and GP2 Series and GP3 Series 

For 2003, BCN stepped up to International Formula 3000. In their first year on that series, they were known as a rent-a-drive team due to high number of drivers who passed by team that year (drivers such as Will Langhorne, Alessandro Piccolo, Ferdinando Monfardini and Rob Nguyen). This year, it had many financial difficulties and virtually did not have a big sponsor.

In 2004, the situation got better — the team ran veteran driver Enrico Toccacelo alongside Argentine youngster Esteban Guerrieri. With the same drivers throughout the year, the team found the pace to reach second place in the Teams' Championiship, with 84 points (56 from Toccacelo and 28 from Guerrieri) just behind the Arden International team.

BCN was considered a threat for the new GP2 Series, alongside other top teams like Super Nova Racing and Arden. In 2005, the team hired Venezuelan star Ernesto Viso and Japanese Hiroki Yoshimoto, anticipating at least, some victories and many points. However, compared to the previous year, 2005 was a great disappointment. BCN could not threaten teams like Arden and ART Grand Prix. The team ended the year with 35 points and 9th place in the Teams' Championiship.

In 2006, Scalabroni's team continued as a midfield team, scoring points occasionally. Yoshimoto continued with the team, first paired with Timo Glock (who brought DHL as sponsor), but the German driver was not comfortable with the team and moved to iSport International at mid-season. Glock's place was filled by Luca Filippi. The team again finished 9th in the Teams' Championship, with 22 points.

For 2007 BCN hired a pair of young Asian talents - Super Aguri F1 test driver Sakon Yamamoto and 2006 German F3 Cup champion Ho-Pin Tung. When Yamamoto stepped up to F1, his place was taken by Finnish driver Markus Niemelä. However, the team was unsuccessful, scoring just four points all year. 2008 was little better, with a succession of drivers competing for the team amidst reported financial troubles. A fourth place for Adrián Vallés at Monaco was the only points-scoring run.

BCN Competición was bought by the Portuguese former F1 (and current WTCC) driver  Tiago Monteiro and José Guedes in November 2008, in a move that relocated the team to the Algarve circuit, being renamed Ocean Racing Technology. Yelmer Buurman and Fabrizio Crestani drove for the team in the 2008-09 GP2 Asia Series season, replacing BCN drivers Yoshimoto and Luca Filippi who competed in the first round of the championship.

In the 2009 GP2 main season, drivers were Álvaro Parente and Karun Chandhok. Parente scored the team's first win in the Spa-Francorchamps round and was 8th in the final Championship standings. Ocean finished the Teams' Championship in 9th, but only two points behind 5th-place finisher iSport International. For 2010, Ocean recruited Max Chilton and Fabio Leimer, with Leimer taking the team's second win, but the team slipped back to twelfth overall in the standings. The following year, Ocean hired Kevin Mirocha (who was later replaced by Brendon Hartley) and Johnny Cecotto Jr.: Hartley scored the team's only points with a fifth-place finish at Spa-Francorchamps, this poor showing again resulting in a twelfth-place teams' championship result.  For the 2012 season, Ocean signed Nigel Melker, and Jon Lancaster, the latter of whom was swiftly dropped when he ran out of money. He was replaced by Hartley for two rounds of the championship, before Victor Guerin took the seat for the remainder of the season. Melker scored 25 points under the revised system, raising Ocean's performance to eleventh overall following the Coloni team's exclusion from the championship.

In January 2013, the team announced its withdrawal from GP2 (having previously announced its withdrawal from the GP3 Series) due to financial problems.  Its place in the series will be taken by new team Hilmer Motorsport.

Complete series results

GP2 Series 

† These drivers raced for more than one team during the season. Their final position includes results for all teams.

GP2 Series 
(key) (Races in bold indicate pole position) (Races in italics indicate fastest lap)

Formula Nissan 2000

International Formula 3000

Spanish Formula Three

Italian Formula 3000

A1 Grand Prix

GP2 Asia Series 

† These drivers raced for more than one team during the season. Their final position includes results for all teams.
* BCN Competición drivers.

GP3 Series

GP3 Series 
(key) (Races in bold indicate pole position) (Races in italics indicate fastest lap)

Sources

External links 
Official BCN Competición website
Official Ocean Racing Technology website

Portuguese auto racing teams
Spanish auto racing teams
International Formula 3000 teams
A1 Grand Prix racing teams
GP2 Series teams
GP3 Series teams
Auto racing teams established in 2008
2008 establishments in Portugal
Auto racing teams disestablished in 2012
Auto GP teams
Euroformula Open Championship teams
Auto racing teams established in 2002